Bruce Jackson may refer to:

Bruce Jackson (audio engineer) (1949–2011), Australian audio electronics design engineer, concert sound engineer
Bruce P. Jackson (born 1952), president of the Project on Transitional Democracies
Bruce Jackson (scholar) (born 1936), American folklorist, documentary filmmaker, and photographer

See also
Albert Bruce Jackson (1876–1947), British botanist